A sabretache (derived from ) is a flat bag or pouch, which was worn suspended from the belt of a cavalry soldier together with the sabre.

Origins
The sabretache is derived from a traditional Hungarian horseman's flat leather bag called a tarsoly. Early examples have been found in the tombs of Magyar warriors from the 10th century Conquest of Pannonia. They were often strengthened and decorated with silver plates and would have contained fire-making tools and other essentials.

Military use
In the early 18th century, hussar cavalry became popular amongst the European powers, and a tarsoly was often a part of the accoutrements. The German name sabretache was adopted, tache meaning "pocket". It fulfilled the function of a pocket, which were absent from the tight fitting uniform of the hussar style. Part of the wartime function of the light cavalry was to deliver orders and dispatches; the sabertache was well suited to hold these. The large front flap was usually heavily embroidered with a royal cypher or regimental crest, and could be used as a firm surface for writing. By the 19th century, other types of cavalry, such as cuirassiers and lancers, also wore them.

In the British Army, sabretaches were first adopted at the end of the 18th century by light dragoon regiments, four of which acquired "hussar" status in 1805. They were still being worn in combat by British cavalry during the Crimean War; "undress" versions in plain black patent leather were used on active duty. The Prussian Guard Hussars wore theirs in the Franco-Prussian War. In most European armies, sabretaches were gradually abandoned for field use by the late 19th century, but were retained by some regiments for ceremonial occasions.

Sabretaches are now much sought after by collectors of militaria.

Gallery

References

Bags

Military uniforms